The Frank and Dorothy Ward House is a single-family residence located at 257 Lakeshore Drive in Battle Creek, Michigan. It was listed on the National Register of Historic Places in 2014.

History
Frank Ward was born in 1912. When he turned 16, he enrolled at the Northwestern Military and Naval Academy in Lake Geneva, Wisconsin. He graduated in 1932, and was commissioned in the US Army. He served in World War II, eventually rising to the rank of colonel. After leaving the military, Ward became the Civil Defense Director for Michigan and, in 1957, he became the Civil Defense Director for Battle Creek.

In 1951, Ward purchased two lots in Battle Creek and began searching for an architect to design a house. He hired Yuzuru Kawahara, who had studied with Frank Lloyd Wright at Taliesin  from 1944 through 1948. Kawahara had assisted other Taliesin graduates with designs, and later went on to become a prolific designer of commercial
structures in San Jose, California. The Ward residence was his first and only solo residential commission. Kawahara designed a Wrightian house that faced the lakefront, and incorporated a fallout shelter in the basement, requested by Ward based on his wartime experiences. The house was built over a year's timeframe, and finished in 1952. The Ward House remained in the ownership of the Ward family until 2013, after which it was sold. The house was demolished in 2017

Description
The Ward House is located on a  triangular lakefront lot with much wider lake frontage than road frontage. The design of the house incorporates extensive lake views. The house is a one-story, L-shaped dwelling with an intersecting, unevenly pitched gable rooflines and wide, overhanging eaves. The walls are made of red brick and cyprus planks, and the house sits on a concrete block foundation. An attached garage is located on one side of the structure. The main entrance to the house is located in the corner formed by the intersecting L.

On the interior, the floor plan contains a central living and dining room area from which two perpendicular wings extend. One wing contains a continuous side hallway, off which are located three bedrooms, two bathrooms and an office. The other wing contains the kitchen and garage. The kitchen also contains a stairwell to the basement.  The basement contains multiple rooms, including an elaborate fallout shelter, separate from the foundations of the house.

References

National Register of Historic Places in Calhoun County, Michigan
Houses completed in 1952
Houses in Kansas